The Communauté de communes du Canton de Fruges et environs  was located in the Pas-de-Calais département, in northern France. It was created in January 1995. It was merged into the new Communauté de communes du Haut Pays du Montreuillois in January 2017.

Composition
It comprised the following 25 communes:

Ambricourt
Avondance
Canlers
Coupelle-Neuve
Coupelle-Vieille
Crépy
Créquy
Embry
Fressin
Fruges
Hézecques
Lebiez
Lugy
Matringhem
Mencas
Planques
Radinghem
Rimboval
Royon
Ruisseauville
Sains-lès-Fressin
Senlis
Torcy
Verchin
Vincly

References 

Fruges